Wildfire is a 1925 American silent drama film directed by T. Hayes Hunter. It was produced by Distinctive Productions, a company founded by George Arliss, and distributed by the Vitagraph Company of America. The film stars Aileen Pringle.

The film is based on the successful 1908 play Wildfire that had starred Lillian Russell on Broadway and a young actor just starting out named Irving Cummings, later a silent director. The story had been filmed before in 1915 with Lillian Russell herself and Lionel Barrymore.

Plot
As described in a film magazine review, Claire Barrington falls heir to a famous racing stable with many debts, whose payment is dependent upon the sweepstakes in which the horse Wildfire is entered. John Duffy, her principal creditor, plots to throw the race to another horse, but Claire learns of the signal that would be used to alert the jockey and uses this to ensure Wildfire is triumphant. A charge of treachery made against John's enemy Garrison is proved false and Claire and Garrison become engaged.

Cast

Preservation status
This film survives in the Library of Congress collection and at the UCLA Film and Television Archive.

References

External links

1925 films
American silent feature films
American films based on plays
Remakes of American films
Films directed by T. Hayes Hunter
1925 drama films
Silent American drama films
American black-and-white films
Vitagraph Studios films
1920s American films